Betty J. Brown (born August 20, 1939) is an American politician and rancher who was a member of the Texas House of Representatives from 1999 to 2011.

Career 
From 1999 to 2011, Brown represented House District 4 for Henderson and Kaufman counties. When she was initially elected to the position in 1998, the district included Kaufman and Hunt counties. After two terms, the district was changed to Kaufman and Henderson counties as far east as Athens, Texas.

In the March 2010 Republican primary, Brown was defeated by Lance Gooden, her former legislative aide.

Controversy 
In 2009, Brown was criticized for her comments made during Texas House Elections Committee testimony on the voting difficulties encountered by Asian Americans who use two different names. During the testimony, Brown suggested that Asian-Americans adopt names that are "easier for Americans to deal with". Though at first defending her statement, accusing Democrats of making the issue "about race", she eventually apologized for the incident, acknowledging the "diversity of Texas" and the "enrichment" that Asian-Americans bring to the state.

References

External links
 Official biography 
 Official page of the Texas House of Representatives' 4th District

Republican Party members of the Texas House of Representatives
1939 births
Living people
People from Terrell, Texas
Ranchers from Texas
Southern Methodist University alumni
21st-century American politicians